is a Japanese anime series produced by Studio Comet, based on the Sanrio character My Melody. The anime is directed by Makoto Moriwaki (High School! Kimengumi The Movie) and produced by Hideyuki Kachi and Kazuya Watanabe. The series was written by Takashi Yamada (Yumeiro Patissiere) with character designs from Tomoko Miyakawa. It ran on TV Osaka and TV Tokyo from April 3, 2005, to March 26, 2006, spanning 52 episodes.

Story

My Melody
A year after the events of Kirara, Kuromi and Baku are imprisoned in a dungeon in Mari Land. They make their escape with the Melody Key and the Melody Bow, but in their haste forget the instruction manuals. They flee to the human world, and shortly after arriving, Kuromi discovers the power of the Melody Key, which makes wishes come true using the power of darkness. If the person who wishes enjoys the nightmare, he or she will produce Black Notes, which Baku promptly eats to store them. What neither one of them realize is that when 100 Black Notes are gathered, the Spirit of Dark Power will be revived to destroy the human world and devour all the humans' dreams. Because Mari Land is formed from the dreams of humans, even the incompetent King is able to sense danger to his people. He gives the Melody Takt to My Melody and sends her to the human world, with a mission to collect 100 Pink Notes to create the Dream Power to combat the Spirit of Dark Power. Along the way, My Melody meets a human girl named Uta Yumeno, and her world is about to change forever.

KuruKuru Shuffle
Set a year after Onegai My Melody, the story revolves around Kuromi and Baku's second escape to the Human World as they this time, obtained a new Melody Key and the Melody Pick, an item associated with the Spirit of Dark Power. Because of this, the King of Mari Land appointed My Melody once again to capture both fugitives and prevent the Spirit of Dark Power from resurrecting for the second time. In the human world, Uta misses My Melody and wonders what is she doing right now back at Mari Land. But then a new student named Jun Hiiragi arrived from England at Uta's school and she notices he was Keiichi's little brother. Baku and Kuromi also arrived at the Human world also and learned that if they collected 8 black notes (do, re, mi, fa, sol, la, si, high do) that coincides with the Solfège scale, their wishes will come true and decided to wreak havoc into the city once more. Back at Mari Land, Keiichi Hiiragi is being judged guilty of his crimes against Mari Land and to make up for it, he must help Uta and My Melody fight the darkness but in secret or he'll be severely punished. It's up to Uta and Melody to stop the Revival of the Spirit of Dark power once again before it's too late.

Sukkiri
A year after the second defeat of the Spirit of Dark Power, My Melody and her friends went back to Mari Land until Baku "dropped a bomb" in the middle of the flower field, taking out black notes all over Mari Land and the human world. After a short while, Mari Land had their "High court" and took the King off the throne. When the time came to choose the next ruler, a black note came to the minister, turning him into a "Huff-Huff" which is a residue of Dar-chan. My Melody refreshed him and was chosen to be a candidate for Princess. However, she has to pass a trial by turning all of the black notes into Twinkle Gems to put in her crown. As soon as Kuromi heard this, she was outraged as she wanted to become the Princess as well, but then a very Mysterious Woman came with an intriguing offer. Kuromi now has to collect Anger Gems and put them in her crown to become the Dark Princess and rule over Mari Land. The two decide to go to the human world and collect every black note for them to become the next ruler of Mari Land. Unbeknownst to everyone...that the spirit again will make its rise as he intends to plunge both Earth and Mari Land into eternal darkness.

Kirara
Set before the events of the Uta Arc, Mari Land is celebrating a special event that involves watching the Shooting Star, on which they can grant someone's wish. In the Human World, Kirara Hoshizuki, a normal elementary girl is watching the stars that night until she was visited by the King of Mari Land who invites her to his world. As the king takes her to Mari Land, she meets My Melody for the first time and become friends as they both watched the shooting stars. But in an unexpected predicament, the Wishing Star crashed and broke into pieces. Even worse, the passageway that connects back to earth is damaged as well. During the disaster, My Melo and Kirara met Prince Sorara, the prince of the star who somewhat transformed into a giant chick after the Wishing Star is broken, and both My Melo and Kirara need to collect all the pieces of the Wishing Star for both Sorara and Kirara to go back to their respective worlds.

High school
Set three years after the end of Sukkiri, Uta Yumeno, now a sophomore in High school, is living a good life in the human world with her family and friends. However, back in Mari Land, Kuromi steals a dark item called Dokurobou, which contains powerful dark magic that can plunge Mary Land into chaos and again escapes into the human world with the said item. As she reaches the human world, she meets with Uta and Kakeru Kogure once more and starts to cause trouble. Luckily, My Melody comes to the human world as well and now must prevent the dark magic inside the Dokurobou from unleashing into the human world.

Characters

Interestingly, the characters in Onegai My Melody were both characters from the original character series and characters created exclusively for the anime. The denizens of Mari Land were somewhat considered "Living Dolls", in reference to Maki's phobia of cute things. Some of the characters in the series were officially added to the Sanrio canon following the show's initial run. For instance, Kuromi, who appeared in the first season of Onegai My Melody, became an official character of the Sanrio parent franchise in 2005.

Several cameo characters from other Sanrio franchise appears in the anime as well. Hello Kitty appears in the eye-catches of the first and second series while Berry and Cherry appeared as narrators for the fourth series.

Music
The music for all four seasons of the anime was composed by Cher Watanabe, whose other notable works include the soundtracks of Kinnikuman Nisei, The Prince of Tennis, Sensual Phrase, Idol Time PriPara, Maken-ki! and Jewelpet Kira☆Deco!.

Theme songs

Onegai My Melody
Opening Theme
 
 Lyrics: Hiroshi Yamada
 Composition: Cher Watanabe
 Arrangement: Cher Watanabe
 Artist: Mikako Takahashi (Interchannel)

Ending Theme
  (EPS 1-28)
 Lyrics: Hideyuki Takahashi
 Composition: Morihiro Suzuki
 Arrangement: Morihiro Suzuki
 Artist: MY MELODIES
  (EPS 29-52)
 Lyrics: Hideyuki Takahashi
 Composition: Morihiro Suzuki
 Arrangement: Morihiro Suzuki
 Artist: MY MELODIES

Onegai My Melody ~Kuru Kuru Shuffle!~
Opening Theme
 
 Lyrics: Hiroshi Yamada
 Composition: Cher Watanabe
 Arrangement: Cher Watanabe
 Artist: Marina Kuroki (Index Music)

Ending Theme
  (EPS 1-27)
 Lyrics: Hideyuki Takahashi
 Composition: Morihiro Suzuki
 Arrangement: Morihiro Suzuki
 Artist: MY MELODIES (Index Music)
 kuru kuru kuru (EP 28)
 Lyrics: Binzu Mameda
 Composition: Mari Konishi
 Arrangement: Mari Konishi
 Artist: Rei Sakuma
  (EP 29)
 Artist: Ryōtarō Okiayu
  (EP 30)
 Artist: Azusa Kataoka and the Dream Defense Girls
  (EP 31)
 Lyrics: Hiroshi Yamada
 Composition: Cher Watanabe
 Arrangement: Cher Watanabe
 Artist: Junko Takeuchi
  (EPS 32-52)
 Lyrics: Hideyuki Takahashi
 Composition: Morihiro Suzuki
 Arrangement: Morihiro Suzuki
 Artist: MY MELODIES (Index Music)

Onegai My Melody Sukkiri♪
Opening Theme
  (EPS 1-27)
 Lyrics: Hiroshi Yamada
 Composition: Cher Watanabe
 Arrangement: Cher Watanabe
 Artist: Marina Kuroki (Index Music)
  (EPS 28-52)
 Lyrics: t@28
 Composition: Cher Watanabe
 Arrangement: Cher Watanabe
 Artist: Nanakana

Ending Theme
  (EPS 1-27)
 Lyrics: Nagae Kuwahara
 Composition: corin.
 Arrangement: corin.
 Artist: Nanakana
  (EPS-29-52)
 Lyrics: Hiroshi Saito
 Composition: Shintaro Itou
 Arrangement: Shintaro Itou
 Artist: MY MELODIES

Onegai My Melody Kirara★
Opening Theme
 
 Lyrics: Takashi Ifukube
 Composition: Seiichiro "Ruffin" Sugiura
 Arrangement: Seiichiro "Ruffin" Sugiura
 Artist: Yuka Uchiyae

Ending Theme
  (EPS 1-27)
 Lyrics: Takashi Ifukube
 Composition: Seiichiro "Ruffin" Sugiura
 Arrangement: Seiichiro "Ruffin" Sugiura
 Artist: Yuka Uchiyae
  (EPS 28-51)
 Lyrics: UZA
 Composition: UZA
 Arrangement: ROUND4
 Artist: Junko Takeuchi, Kōki Miyata and Izumi Kitta
  (EP 52)
 Lyrics: Hideyuki Takahashi
 Composition: Cher Watanabe
 Arrangement: Cher Watanabe
 Artist: Friends of Mary Land

Sequels
Four official sequels were produced and each coincides with their respective story arcs. The first sequel,  ran from April 2, 2006, to March 23, 2007. The second sequel,  ran from April 1, 2007, to March 24, 2008, as a segment on Anime Lobby.

Sukkiri was followed by a third and final sequel, which ran from April 6, 2008, to March 29, 2009. before being replaced by Jewelpet in its timeslot.

On February 5, 2012, Sanrio announced that a theatrical short named Onegai My Melody: Yū & Ai was in the works and would be released alongside the first Jewelpet film, Jewelpet the Movie: Sweets Dance Princess as a double feature.

A light novel titled  , serves as a continuation of the franchise and was released by PHP Interface under the Smash Bunko label on March 8, 2013.

Reception
Although it only aired in Japan, Taiwan, Hong Kong, South Korea, Italy, Spain, Portugal, Thailand, and the Philippines, Onegai My Melody was positively received among fans of Sanrio's character franchises, and has garnered a cult following. On December 11, 2011, United States-based anime distributor Funimation (now owned by Sony Pictures) set up a forum on its website gauging consumer interest in potential anime acquisitions. One title requested was the first Onegai My Melody series.

References

External links
 Onegai My Melody official website
 Onegai My Melody ~Kuru Kuru Shuffle~ official website
 Onegai Mu Melody Sukiri♪ official website
 Onegai My Melody Kirara★ official website
 

2012 anime films
2013 Japanese novels
Animated television series about animals
Aniplex
Comedy anime and manga
Japanese children's animated comedy television series
Japanese children's animated fantasy television series
Light novels
Anime and manga about parallel universes
Magical girl anime and manga
Romance anime and manga
Sanrio characters
Animated television series about children
Television series about parallel universes
Animated television series about rabbits and hares
Television series about shapeshifting